Wang Mei-hua (born 10 August 1958) is a Taiwanese politician.

Education
Wang earned her bachelor's degree in law from National Taiwan University.

Political career
Wang was the director-general of the Intellectual Property Office within the Ministry of Economic Affairs until July 2016, when she was named vice minister of economic affairs. She remained vice minister through June 2019, and became deputy minister later that month. Wang was promoted to economics affairs minister on 19 June 2020, succeeding Shen Jong-chin, who had assumed the vice premiership.

References

Living people
1958 births
Taiwanese Ministers of Economic Affairs
National Taiwan University alumni
Women government ministers of Taiwan
Spouses of Taiwanese politicians